is a national expressway in the Kinki region of Japan. It is owned and operated by West Nippon Expressway Company. The route is signed E91 under Ministry of Land, Infrastructure, Transport and Tourism's  "2016 Proposal for Realization of Expressway Numbering."

Route description
Minami-Hanna Road passes through Mihara-ku, Sakai, Sakai, Habikino, back into Mihara-ku, Sakai, and Habikino, back into Mihara-ku, Sakai, Habikino, and finally Taishi in Osaka Prefecture. It then crosses into Katsuragi in Nara Prefecture.

Naming
Hanna is a kanji acronym of two characters. The first character represents Osaka (大阪) and the second character represents Nara (奈良). Minami (南) means south.

History
Construction on the toll road was completed on 28 March 2004. After opening, the road was managed by the Osaka Prefecutural Road Public Corporation and Japan Highway Public Corporation. 

On 1 April 2018, the Osaka Prefecutural Road Public Corporation transferred ownership between Mihara Junction and Habikino Interchange and the tolling of the road to NEXCO West Japan.

Junction list
TB= Toll booth

References

External links 
 West Nippon Expressway Company
 Osaka Prefecutural Road Public Corporation

Toll roads in Japan
Regional High-Standard Highways in Japan
Roads in Nara Prefecture
Roads in Osaka Prefecture